"In the Western Tradition" is a science fiction short story by Phyllis Eisenstein. It was first published in The Magazine of Fantasy and Science Fiction, in March 1981.

Synopsis

Alison is a time viewer technician supervising research into the Old West, who becomes fixated on one of the long-dead subjects of the project's surveillance.

Reception
"In the Western Tradition" was a finalist for the 1982 Hugo Award for Best Novella, and for the Nebula Award for Best Novella of 1981.

James Nicoll considered it to be a "gem". Steven H. Silver, however, found the story to be "a little on the long side", and faulted it for not adequately resolving issues surrounding Alison's romance with her coworker Barry.

References

Works originally published in The Magazine of Fantasy & Science Fiction